John Lee Anthony Tapia (February 13, 1967 – May 27, 2012) was an American professional boxer who competed from 1988 to 2011. He held multiple world championships in three weight classes, including the unified IBF and WBO super flyweight titles between 1994 and 1998, the unified WBA and WBO bantamweight titles between 1998 and 2000, and the IBF featherweight title in 2002. His 1999 loss by decision to Paulie Ayala was named the Fight of the Year by The Ring magazine.

Tapia was inducted during 2017, posthumously, to the International Boxing Hall of Fame.

Early life
Tapia was born in Albuquerque, New Mexico to Mexican American parents. His father had reportedly been murdered while his mother was pregnant with him. When he was eight years old, his mother, Virginia, was kidnapped, raped, repeatedly stabbed, and left for dead by her assailant. Raised thereafter by his grandmother, Tapia turned to boxing at the age of nine.

Amateur career
Tapia had an outstanding amateur career, winning the 1983 New Mexico State Golden Gloves, the 1983 and 1985 National Golden Gloves tournaments at light flyweight and flyweight, respectively.

Professional career

Super flyweight

Early years
Tapia's professional boxing career began on March 25, 1988, when he fought Effren Chavez in Irvine, California. After four rounds of boxing the fight was called a draw. He won eight fights that year, five by knockout, of which four were in the first round.
In 1989, he won seven more fights, including a first-round knockout of Abner Barajas and an eight-round decision against John Michael Johnson.

In 1990, he won seven bouts, including an eight-round decision over Jesus Chong, an eleventh-round technical knockout of Roland Gomez in Reno that gave him the USBA super flyweight title, and a twelve-round decision over Luigi Camputaro, to retain that title. Tapia was, by the end of the year, a known boxer, his name often appearing in magazine articles. However, his career came to a halt for the next three and a half years after being suspended from boxing for testing positive for cocaine.

When he finally returned to the ring on March 27, 1994, he beat Jaime Olvera by a knockout in four rounds in Tulsa, Oklahoma. He won three more fights by knockout, and then he faced Oscar Aguilar on the Michael Carbajal–Josué Camacho undercard in Phoenix for the NABF super flyweight title, winning in three rounds. Five days later the Albuquerque Police claimed they found cocaine after the fight in a bag carried by Tapia. Tapia claimed what the police found was only a soap bar, and the charges were eventually dropped.

First world title
On October 12, 1994 at The Pit, Albuquerque, New Mexico, Tapia defeated Henry Martínez in eleven rounds to win the vacant WBO super flyweight title. He then knocked out former champion Rolando Bohol in the second round. In his first title defense, Tapia defeated Jose Rafael Sosa by decision.

He retained the title with a nine-round technical draw with Ricardo Vargas and a decision in twelve against his onetime nemesis in the amateur ranks, Arthur Johnson. After two more wins, he gave Willy Salazar a title shot, knocking him out in nine rounds.
In 1996, he fought six more times, keeping his undefeated record and defending the title five additional times during that period, which included wins against Giovanni Andrade, Ivan Alvarez, future champion Hugo Rafael Soto, Sammy Stewart and Adonis Cruz. By then, a heated rivalry was cooking up between him and IBF champion Danny Romero. Their rivalry had begun many years earlier when Romero's father trained both boxers. Tapia's split with the Romero family had not been on good terms.

Tapia vs Romero unification
1997 saw Tapia fend off a challenge from Jorge Barrera in three rounds. After that, the fight with Romero was set for Las Vegas. The fight took place on July 18. Tapia won by a unanimous twelve-round decision, adding the IBF title to his WBO belt. In his next fight, he defeated Puerto Rico's Andy Agosto via decision. Tapia began 1998 by successfully defending his championships for the 11th time against former world champion Rodolfo Blanco of Colombia via decision, and then he vacated his world titles in order to move up in weight.

Bantamweight
On December 5, 1998, Tapia defeated WBA bantamweight champion Nana Konadu by decision to become a two-division world champion.

Tapia vs. Ayala
In 1999, Tapia suffered his first loss in his 48-bout career, losing a decision and the WBA title to Paulie Ayala in what The Ring Magazine called its "Fight of the Year." Later that year, Tapia tried to commit suicide with a drug overdose and required hospitalization. Back quickly after that, he was given a shot at the WBO title. He became a two time world bantamweight champion by beating Jorge Eliecer Julio by a decision at Albuquerque on January 8, 2000. After he defended his belt with a decision over Javier Torres, a rematch with Ayala to unify the belt was set up. Ayala won by unanimous decision in a fight that ring observers largely felt Tapia won; following the fight, Showtime commentators said that Tapia "put on a clinic" and "something's not right," nearly labeling the decision as rigged.

Featherweight
Tapia returned home to prepare for bouts in 2001, when he went up in weight and beat Famosito Gomez by a knockout in six, and former WBC featherweight champion Cesar Soto by knockout in three.

In 2002, Tapia traveled to London, where he knocked out Eduardo Enrique Alvarez in the first round; after the bout, he was interviewed by former rival Romero. Tapia's next bout, for the IBF featherweight title, was versus Manuel Medina. Tapia won a dubious decision, becoming a world title holder in three different divisions. He left the title vacant so he could face Lineal & The Ring champion Marco Antonio Barrera, who beat Tapia by unanimous decision.

Comeback
Tapia returned on the night of October 4, 2003, defeating Carlos Contreras by ten round unanimous decision at Albuquerque.

On April 15, 2005, he sustained an injury to his left eye, but was able to continue and win a repeat match-up with Frankie Archuleta. That win came by ten round split decision in Albuquerque.

At 38, Tapia faced little-known Sandro Marcos in Chicago. In the second round, Marcos connected with a left hook to the body. Tapia fell to the canvas, clutching his ribcage, as referee Genaro Rodriguez reached the count of 10.

Later career and problems
On January 17, 2007, Tapia held a press conference stating that he would face Ilido Julio on February 23 in his home town of Albuquerque, New Mexico, then retire. The bout was being promoted as The Final Fury and Tapia promised he would win. Tapia won the fight by majority decision, 98–92, 96–94, 95–95.

Tapia was found unconscious and not breathing in a hotel room early on the morning of March 12, 2007. Tapia was hospitalized in critical condition from an apparent cocaine overdose at Albuquerque Presbyterian Hospital.

The next day, on the morning of March 13, Tapia's brother-in-law and nephew were killed in an automobile accident on U.S. Highway 550 near Bloomfield, New Mexico, apparently en route to the hospital to visit Tapia. That same day, Tapia was upgraded from critical to serious condition.

Tapia was scheduled to make a comeback on May 2, 2008, in El Paso, Texas, but pulled out due to contractual disputes with promoter Ron Weathers.

On February 11, 2009, Tapia was taken into custody in Albuquerque for a violation of parole related to cocaine use.

Tapia beat Jorge Alberto Reyes by a knockout in the 4th round on March 6, 2010, at the Ohkay Casino, San Juan Pueblo, New Mexico, United States, in front of a sold-out crowd.

Personal life
Tapia was married to Teresa Tapia in 1994 and had three boys. The family lived in Albuquerque, NM.

He had many tattoos, which were prominent when he was fighting. One of them said Mi Vida Loca ("My Crazy Life"), the nickname he adopted. He wrote an autobiography by that title. He was a born-again Christian.

In 2010, at age 43, Tapia learned that apparently, his father was alive. Jerry Padilla, who Tapia already knew, was supposedly intrigued by the similarities in their mannerisms, and the two decided to submit to a DNA test, which proved they were father and son. After Tapia died in 2012, his widow briefly married his alleged half-brother, Jeffrey Padilla, in 2014. However, she felt it wrong that the senior Padilla had “jokingly” mingled his DNA swabs with Tapia in 2010, getting a court order to compare a new and controlled swab with some of Tapia's tissue, proving in 2017 that they were not father and son.

Death
On May 27, 2012, Tapia was found dead in his Albuquerque home. He was 45 years old. Tapia died of heart failure.

Professional boxing record

References

External links

Johnny Tapia Interview at convictedartist.com

1967 births
2012 deaths
American boxers of Mexican descent
American male boxers
Boxers from Albuquerque, New Mexico
Doping cases in boxing
Flyweight boxers
International Boxing Federation champions
Light-flyweight boxers
Lightweight boxers
National Golden Gloves champions
World bantamweight boxing champions
World Boxing Association champions
World Boxing Organization champions
World featherweight boxing champions
World super-flyweight boxing champions
International Boxing Hall of Fame inductees